Lava Bangers is the second studio album by American hip hop producer Lazerbeak, a member of Minneapolis indie hip hop collective Doomtree.

Release
The album was released January 24, 2012, on Doomtree Records, and features scratches from DJ Plain Ole Bill.

Producer
The album was fully produced by Lazerbeak.

Video
The song "Lift Every Voice" was released with a music video via Doomtree's YouTube page.

Track listing

References

External links 
 Lava Bangers at Bandcamp
 Lava Bangers at Discogs

2012 albums
Lazerbeak albums
Doomtree Records albums